Joanne Carol Henry (born 2 October 1971) is a former New Zealand heptathlete. She won a bronze medal in the women's heptathlon at the 1998 Commonwealth Games.

References

1971 births
Living people
New Zealand heptathletes
Olympic athletes of New Zealand
Athletes (track and field) at the 1992 Summer Olympics
Commonwealth Games bronze medallists for New Zealand
Athletes (track and field) at the 1990 Commonwealth Games
Athletes (track and field) at the 1994 Commonwealth Games
Athletes (track and field) at the 1998 Commonwealth Games
Commonwealth Games medallists in athletics
20th-century New Zealand women
21st-century New Zealand women
New Zealand female hurdlers
Medallists at the 1998 Commonwealth Games